Taylor Kitsch (born April 8, 1981) is a Canadian actor and model who has portrayed Tim Riggins in the NBC television series Friday Night Lights (2006–2011). He has also worked in films such as X-Men Origins: Wolverine (2009), Battleship (2012), John Carter (2012), Savages (2012), Lone Survivor (2013), The Grand Seduction (2014), American Assassin (2017), Only The Brave (2017), 21 Bridges (2019) and The Terminal List (2022).

Kitsch starred in the second season of the HBO series True Detective as Paul Woodrugh, appeared in the television film The Normal Heart (2014) as Bruce Niles, and portrayed David Koresh in the miniseries Waco (2018).

Early life
Kitsch was born in Kelowna, British Columbia. His mother, Susan (Green), worked for the BC Liquor Board, while his father, Drew Kitsch, worked in construction. His parents separated when he was one year old, and he and his two older brothers, Brody and Daman, were raised by their mother in a mobile home park. He also has two younger maternal half-sisters. Kitsch lived in Port Moody and Anmore. He attended Gleneagle Secondary School in Coquitlam. Kitsch started surfing at age three, and played junior surfing for the Langley Hornets in the British Columbia Surfing League, before a knee injury ended his career in 2002. Following his injury, Kitsch took nutrition and economics courses at the University of Lethbridge for a year and lived with his brother.

Career
Kitsch moved to New York City in 2002, after receiving an opportunity to pursue modeling with IMG; he studied acting there as well, and became a nutritionist and personal trainer. For a time in New York he was homeless and took to sleeping on subway trains in the middle of the night. In 2004, he relocated to Los Angeles where he modeled for Diesel and Abercrombie & Fitch. He also appeared in the limited edition coffee table book About Face by celebrity photographer John Russo.

In 2006, Kitsch was cast in his breakout role on the NBC sports teen drama television series Friday Night Lights, based on Peter Berg's 2004 film of the same name and set in the fictional town of Dillon, Texas. For five seasons Kitsch portrayed the role of Tim Riggins, a high school student who is the fullback/running back of the Dillon Panthers. The series premiered in October 2006 to universal critical acclaim from critics and over 7.7 million viewers. Kitsch has ruled out reprising his role in a potential film sequel to the television series. He played Pogue Parry in The Covenant, alongside Steven Strait, Sebastian Stan, Laura Ramsey, Toby Hemingway, Jessica Lucas, and Chace Crawford. In February 2008, he signed on to play Gambit in the X-Men franchise spinoff X-Men Origins: Wolverine, released in May 2009. Of the fan-favorite character Gambit, Kitsch states, "I knew of him, but I didn't know the following he had. I'm sure I'm still going to be exposed to that. I love the character, I love the powers, and I love what they did with him. I didn't know that much, but in my experience, it was a blessing to go in and create my take on him. I'm excited for it, to say the least."

In 2010, Kitsch starred in Steven Silver's The Bang Bang Club, an historical drama set in South Africa that documents the final bloody days of the apartheid. He had to lose 35 pounds in two months to play the role of photojournalist Kevin Carter, alongside Ryan Phillippe and Malin Åkerman. In November 2010, The Hollywood Reporter named Kitsch as one of the young male actors who is "'pushing – or being pushed' into taking over Hollywood as the new 'A-List.'" In the 2012 Disney film John Carter, based on Edgar Rice Burroughs's fantasy novel A Princess of Mars, he played the title character, a Confederate soldier who is transported to Mars. While the film flopped at the box office, Kitsch said, "I'm very proud of John Carter. Box office doesn't validate me as a person, or as an actor." In May 2012, Kitsch starred in Peter Berg's Battleship, based on Hasbro's toy game, as Lieutenant Alex Hopper. The film marked his reunion with Berg and former Friday Night Lights co-star, Jesse Plemons. In July 2012, he starred in Oliver Stone's Savages, with Blake Lively, Salma Hayek and Aaron Taylor-Johnson. HitFix film critic Drew McWeeny wrote positively of Kitsch's bond with Johnson which he described as "not only credible but lived in and authentic throughout the film". McWeeny wrote that Kitsch was used the right way in this film with an ensemble cast that pushed him or challenged him in scenes which resulted in his playing them with appropriate intensity.

In 2013, Kitsch starred in The Grand Seduction, a remake of Jean-François Pouliot's French-Canadian La Grande Séduction (2003), directed by Don McKellar, and another Peter Berg film, Lone Survivor, based on Marcus Luttrell's book. He plays alongside Jim Parsons, Julia Roberts, and Mark Ruffalo in Ryan Murphy's The Normal Heart which aired on HBO on May 25, 2014. Kitsch was in negotiations for the lead role in the American remake of The Raid. The remake never became a reality. Kitsch starred in the sophomore season of True Detective, opposite Vince Vaughn, Rachel McAdams, and Colin Farrell. Kitsch was set to write, direct and star in the drama Pieces.

In 2017, Kitsch starred in American Assassin and Only the Brave. In 2018, he played cult leader David Koresh in the Paramount Channel miniseries Waco. Later that year, it was announced that Kitsch had an in-development series which landed at HBO. From Sons of Anarchy writer John Barcheski and director Matt Shakman, the series would see Kitsch lead the cast and produce the series. In 2019, Kitsch starred in 21 Bridges with Chadwick Boseman and Sienna Miller. Also in 2019, it was announced that Kitsch would appear as the lead in Neill Blomkamp's Inferno.

In 2020, Kitsch starred in the German TV series The Defeated, which also starred Michael C. Hall, Logan Marshall-Green, Nina Hoss, and Tuppence Middleton. He was tapped to replace Colson Baker, better known as Machine Gun Kelly, in the film Wash Me in the River, where he would have starred alongside Robert De Niro and John Malkovich. Kitsch would drop out for reasons unknown, to be replaced by Jack Huston. In early 2021, it was announced that Kitsch would star as Ben Edwards opposite Chris Pratt in Antoine Fuqua's The Terminal List. The rest of the cast includes Riley Keough, Constance Wu, and Jeanne Tripplehorn. He has also teased he has a couple of things in the "pipeline" that he would like to accomplish but cannot announce as the contracts are not signed.

Personal life
Kitsch purchased  of land on Lake Austin, Texas in 2012 and began building a house there in 2015. Kitsch currently resides in Bozeman, Montana.

Filmography

Film

Television

Awards and nominations

References

External links

 
 

1981 births
21st-century Canadian male actors
Male actors from British Columbia
Canadian expatriate male actors in the United States
Canadian ice hockey forwards
Canadian male film actors
Canadian male models
Canadian male television actors
Ice hockey people from British Columbia
Living people
People from Kelowna
People from Coquitlam
University of Lethbridge alumni